Deltshevia is a genus of Asian tree trunk spiders that was first described by Yuri M. Marusik & Victor R. Fet in 2009.  it contains only two species: D. danovi and D. gromovi.

References

Araneomorphae genera
Hersiliidae
Spiders of Asia